is a Japanese professional footballer who currently plays for Hong Kong Premier League club Southern.

Career
Upon graduating from Kansai University where he played on the varsity team, Sasaki signed his first professional contract with the Blacktown Spartans of the National Premier Leagues in Australia. He played with them from 2014 to 2016, when the club were relegated.

In January 2017, Sasaki signed with Philippines Football League club Global Cebu. He made his debut on 24 January in an 2017 AFC Champions League qualifying play-off match against Sinaporean side Tampines Rovers. He scored his first goal for the club 5 April in a 2017 AFC Cup match against Indonesian side Johor Darul Ta'zim.

On 20 February 2018, Sasaki signed with Hong Kong Premier League club Rangers. He scored his first goal for the club on 4 March in a 2–2 draw against R&F.

Following Rangers' relegation to the Hong Kong First Division, Sasaki joined Pegasus on 2 July 2018. 

On 8 April 2020, Sasaki agreed to a mutual termination with Pegasus after the club decided to cut costs due to the 2020 coronavirus pandemic and the subsequent suspension of the 2019–20 season.

On 2 May 2020, Southern announced the signing of Sasaki.

References

External links
 Shu Sasaki at HKFA
 
 

Hong Kong Premier League players
Japanese expatriates in Hong Kong
Expatriate footballers in Hong Kong
Japanese expatriate footballers
Japanese footballers
Expatriate footballers in the Philippines
Expatriate soccer players in Australia
Global Makati F.C. players
Hong Kong Rangers FC players
TSW Pegasus FC players
Southern District FC players
Association football forwards
Association football midfielders
Living people
1991 births
Japanese expatriates in the Philippines
Japanese expatriates in Australia
Hong Kong League XI representative players